Nikita Korovkin (born December 3, 1983) is a former Russian professional ice hockey defenceman who played in the Russian Superleague and Kontinental Hockey League (KHL). He was selected by the Philadelphia Flyers in the 6th round (192nd overall) of the 2002 NHL Entry Draft.

Career statistics

References

External links
 

1983 births
Living people
Amur Khabarovsk players
HC Vityaz players
Kamloops Blazers players
Pensacola Ice Pilots players
People from Zlatoust
Philadelphia Flyers draft picks
Phoenix RoadRunners players
Russian ice hockey defencemen
San Diego Gulls (ECHL) players
Syracuse Crunch players
Traktor Chelyabinsk players
Tri-City Americans players
Sportspeople from Chelyabinsk Oblast